The CC-Link Open Automation Networks Family are a group of open industrial networks that enable devices from numerous manufacturers to communicate.  They are used in a wide variety of industrial automation applications at the machine, cell and line levels.

History
The CC-Link Partner Association (CLPA) offers a family of open-architecture networks. These originated with the CC-Link (Control & Communication) fieldbus in 1996, developed by Mitsubishi Electric Corporation. In 2000, this was released as an “Open” network so that independent automation equipment manufacturers could incorporate CLPA network compatibility into their products.
In the same year, the CC-Link Partner Association (CLPA) was formed to manage and oversee the network technology and support manufacturer members. In 2007, the CLPA was the first organisation to introduce open gigabit Ethernet for automation with CC-Link IE (Industrial Ethernet). In 2018, the CLPA was the first organisation to combine open gigabit Ethernet with Time-Sensitive Networking (TSN) as CC-Link IE TSN. As of May 2020, over 2,100 CLPA compatible products from more than 340 automation manufacturers were available. 
CLPA offers a variety of open automation network technologies. These are the CC-Link fieldbus, CC-Link Safety fieldbus, CC-Link IE and CC-Link IE TSN. Compatible products include industrial PCs, PLCs, robots, servos, drives, valve manifolds, digital & analogue I/O modules, temperature controllers, mass flow controllers and others. As of May 2020, there was approximately 30 million devices installed worldwide.

Structure of the CLPA
The CLPA is a global organisation with branches in 11 locations worldwide (Japan, Taiwan, Singapore, Thailand, China, South Korea, India, Turkey, Germany, USA and Mexico). The headquarters are in Nagoya, Japan. Some branches offer conformance testing facilities (see below). The CLPA is controlled by a board of ten companies, who are 3M, Analog Devices, Balluff, Cisco, Cognex Corporation, IDEC Corporation, Mitsubishi Electric, Molex, NEC and Pro-face. The board controls the strategic direction of the organisation and oversees its operations, including the activities of the technical and marketing task forces and the global branches.

Industry Cooperation
The CLPA has been involved in strategic cooperation with other open technology associations in the industrial automation space. These include PROFIBUS & PROFINET International (PI), the OPC Foundation and AutomationML. The cooperation with PI resulted in a standard for interoperability between CC-Link IE and PROFINET. The OPC Foundation activity created an OPC UA companion specification for the CLPA's "CSP+ (Control & Communication System Profile) For Machine" technology. Cooperation with AutomationML involved the signing of a Memorandum of Understanding to incorporate the "CSP+" and "CSP+ For Machine" device profile technologies into AutomationML models.

Standardization
CLPA has obtained the following certifications for its open network technologies: 
 ISO standards: ISO15745-5 (CC-Link, January 2007)
 IEC standards: IEC61158 (CC-Link IE, August 2014), IEC61784 (CC-Link & CC-Link IE, August 2014), IEC61784-3-8 (CC-Link Safety, August 2016) 
 SEMI standards: SEMI E54.12 (CC-Link, December 20010, SEMI E54.23-0513 (CC-Link IE Field, May 20130
 Chinese National Standards: GB/Z 19760-2005 (CC-Link, December 2005), GB/T 20229.4-6 (CC-Link, December 2006), GB/Z 19760-2008 (CC-Link, June 2009), GB/Z 29496.1.2.3-2013, GB/T 33537.1~3-2017 (CC-Link IE, April 2017), GB/Z 37085-2018 (CC-Link IE Safety, December 2018)
 Japanese Industrial Standards: JIS TR B0031 (CC-Link Safety, certified May 2013)
 Korean National Standards: KBS ISO 15745-5 (CC-Link, March 2008)
 Taiwan Standard: CNS 15252X6068 (CC-Link, May 2009)

Technical overview of the CC-Link open network family
CC-Link (V2.0):
 RS485 based fieldbus
 Max.10 Mbit/s network transmission
 Based on RS485 with networks up to 1.2 km, or extended to 13.2 km with repeaters
 64 stations per network
 Refresh time of 4-16 msecs for 64 stations
 Master/Slave network with Floating Masters and hot swap of stations
 Hardware implementation
CC-Link Safety:
 RS485 based functional safety fieldbus
 Max.10 Mbit/s network transmission
 Based on CC-Link
 Can combine Safety devices with standard devices on the same network
 Compliance with IEC 61508 SIL3 and ISO13849-1 Category 4
 Hardware implementation
CC-Link IE Control:
 Gigabit Ethernet optical network intended for "backbone" communications through a factory or along a production line
 Dual redundant 1 Gbit/s 1000base-SX Ethernet optical fibre based network
 120 stations per network (Master station: 1, slave station: 119)
 550 meters between stations
 Ring configuration (no switches required)
 Deterministic real-time performance
 Hardware implementation
CC-Link IE Field:
 Gigabit Ethernet network intended for communication between controllers and field devices
 1 Gbit/s 1000base-T (Category 5e or better) Ethernet based network
 121 stations per network (Master station: 1, slave station: 120)
 Star, line & ring configurations (networks can be built without switches)
 Up to 239 networks can be connected together
 100 meters between stations
 Deterministic real-time performance
 Hardware implementation
CC-Link IE Field Basic:
 Software based version of CC-Link IE intended for general performance devices
 100Mbit 100base-T (Category 5e or better) Ethernet based network
 64 stations per network
 Star configuration (using network switch)
 Software implementation
CC-Link IE TSN:
 Based on CC-Link IE with Time-Sensitive Networking(TSN) capabilities added
 Software or hardware implementation
 1Gbit or 100Mbit physical layers (Category 5e or better)
 64,770 stations per network
 Line, star, ring and mesh configurations
 Deterministic real-time performance
Seamless Messaging Protocol (SLMP)
 Client/server protocol for point to point communications between standard TCP/IP Ethernet devices and CC-Link IE networks
 Supports 100Mbit physical layer
 Software implementation
Control & Communication System Profile (CSP+)
 Device profiles intended to simplify the configuration and maintenance of CC-Link family networks
 Required for device certification

Conformance Testing
All certification testing for CLPA networks is carried out by the CLPA and is compulsory in order to ensure that devices manufactured by suppliers meet the strict technical performance standards. These include noise resistance and correct communication functionality.
To declare a product as CLPA certified, a vendor needs to successfully test their product at one of the CLPA test laboratories situated in the US, China, Korea, Japan or Germany.

See also
Industrial Ethernet
Fieldbus
Automation

References

External links 
 CLPA Global Site
 CLPA Europe Site
 SEMI E54.12-0701E (Reapproved 1106) - Specification for Sensor/Actuator Network Communications for CC-Link

Industrial automation
Industrial computing